CMY may refer to:

 CMY color model
 Crossmyloof railway station's National Rail station code
 Sparta/Fort McCoy Airport's IATA code
 CMY, the ICAO code for Cape Smythe Air

ja:色空間#CMY